Ari Fuld was an American-Israeli who was murdered in a terrorist attack by a Palestinian terrorist at the Gush Etzion Junction.

Background 
Ari Fuld, 45, was born in New York and immigrated to Israel in 1994. The married father of four lived in the Israeli settlement of Efrat. A Holocaust survivor's grandson, Fuld was a fourth-degree black belt who served in an elite unit in the Israeli paratroopers. He was well-known on social media for his pro-Israel advocacy, and worked for an organization that supports Israel Defense Forces (IDF) soldiers. He was known to give care packages to IDF soldiers fighting in Gaza.

The murder 
On 16 September 2018, while waiting outside of a shopping mall at the Gush Etzion Junction, Fuld was stabbed in the back by 17-year-old Palestinian terrorist, Khalil Yusef Ali Jabarin. Mortally wounded, Fuld chased Jabarin, jumped over a small wall, and his legs buckled. After righting himself, Fuld pulled his gun and shot Jabarin. Security video footage showed that Fuld chased and fired at Jabarin before collapsing. Fuld was taken to a hospital where he was pronounced dead. Jabarin was taken to a hospital and survived.

Fuld was credited with possibly saving the life of a mall employee when he stopped the terrorist, who ran at the woman with his knife drawn. The employee said that Fuld is "not just a hero. He gave his life for me.”

Funeral 
Thousands of people attended Fuld's funeral in Kfar Etzion. Israeli Prime Minister Benjamin Netanyahu met with Fuld's family before the funeral and later tweeted, "I embraced [the family] in the name of the entire nation in this time of terrible grief. We are alive thanks to heroes like Ari. We will remember him forever.”

House demolition 
It was first reported that Jabarin's mother, from the village of Yatta, informed Palestinian and Israeli security forces that Jabarin planned to carry out a terrorist attack. However, in court it was revealed that his mother came to the checkpoint searching for her son and that she did not inform the soldier why.  

The day after Fuld's murder, IDF soldiers raided the Jabarin home to map out the building and prepare it for demolition. The IDF released a statement that they will destroy the Jabarin's home in order "to act determinedly to prevent terror attacks and to deter terrorists". The Jabarin family appealed the demolition, but Israel's Supreme Court rejected the appeal. The home was ultimately blown up by the IDF.

Arrest and trial
Jabarin was arrested for murder, three counts of attempted murder, and possession of an unlicensed weapon. The Judea Juvenile Military Court ordered that he remain in custody until the end of the trial. 

Jabarin was convicted of Fuld's murder in January 2020 after a closed trial. He was sentenced to life in prison, the Fuld family was awarded 1.25 million shekels ($365,000) in damages.

Pay for Slay 
It was reported that the Palestinian Authority will pay Jabarin's family NIS 1,400 (nearly $400) a month for three years. An anti-"Pay for Slay" law had earlier been passed in Israel to stop such financial support, however the Jerusalem Post reported that the law had yet to be implemented.

Reactions 
Retired British army officer Richard Kemp said that Fuld was "a soldier to the last".

References 

2018 in Israel
Deaths by person in Asia
2018 deaths
Palestinian terrorism victims
Israeli victims of crime
History of Gush Etzion
Deaths by stabbing in the Palestinian territories
Deaths by stabbing in Israel
Terrorist incidents in Israel in 2018
Terrorist incidents involving knife attacks
American people murdered abroad